Police Academy is a 1984 American comedy film directed by Hugh Wilson in his directorial debut, and distributed by Warner Bros. Pictures. Its story follows a new recruitment policy for an unnamed police department's academy that is required to take in any recruit who wishes to try out to be a police officer. The film stars Steve Guttenberg, Kim Cattrall, and G.W. Bailey.

The film was produced by The Ladd Company. It premiered on March 23, 1984. It grossed $8.5 million in its opening weekend and over $149 million worldwide, against a budget of $4.5 million, and remains the most successful film of the series as of 2022. The film spawned six sequels in the Police Academy franchise.

Plot
Due to a shortage of police officers, Mary Sue Beal, the mayor of an unnamed city, requires the police department to accept all recruits. Easy-going Carey Mahoney, a repeat offender, is given a choice by Police Captain Reed: enroll in the police academy or go to jail. Mahoney agrees to the former, but plans to perform badly enough to be expelled, since he cannot quit without facing jail time. The chief of police, Henry Hurst, outraged by the Mayor's plan, decides to make the experience so bad for the new recruits that they give up.

Lieutenant Thaddeus Harris makes their lives miserable, though Commandant Eric Lassard wants to give the new cadets a chance. Harris appoints Copeland and Blankes as squad leaders to help him.

Lassard reveals to Mahoney his deal with Capt. Reed to keep him at the police academy for the full term. Mahoney falls in love with cadet Karen Thompson and befriends fellow cadets Larvell Jones, a human beatbox, ladies' man George Martin, gun-obsessed security guard Eugene Tackleberry, cowardly man Leslie Barbara, accident-prone Douglas Fackler and gentle giant Moses Hightower.

Blankes and Copeland investigate a party organized by Mahoney, who tricks them by saying that the party is at the Blue Oyster, a gay bar. The pair plant a prostitute in Mahoney's dormitory, to be found during room checks. While smuggling her off campus, Mahoney is forced to hide with her under a lectern as Commandant Lassard leads in a group of officers. While Mahoney is not looking, the prostitute performs fellatio on Lassard. Mahoney steps out from under the lectern but finds Lassard still present, leading Lassard to assume Mahoney did it.

Hightower reveals to Mahoney that he has not driven a car since he was 12. To help Hightower prepare for a driving test, they steal Copeland's car. After Hightower passes the test, Copeland racially insults cadet Laverne Hooks for an accident. Hightower, angered by the insult, overturns the car with Copeland inside. Harris ejects Hightower from the academy, upsetting the other cadets.

Blankes and Copeland fail to trick Mahoney into fighting them after they find Copeland's destroyed car. Barbara stands up for Mahoney and knocks Copeland out with a lunch tray. Blankes retaliates, and Mahoney becomes involved in a brawl. When Harris asks who started the fight, Mahoney takes the blame to protect Barbara's standing and is expelled.

While downtown, Fackler throws an apple out of a police car, which hits a man on the back of the head; this triggers a chain reaction of violence which quickly escalates into a riot. Mahoney, just about to leave, instead joins the other cadets to pacify the crowd. The cadets are accidentally transported to the epicenter of the rioting, and one criminal steals Blankes and Copeland's revolvers, whereupon the two hide out in the Blue Oyster Bar. A gang captures Harris, with their group leader taking him as a hostage. Mahoney attempts to rescue Harris but is also taken hostage. Hightower appears, deceives the madman, and knocks him down a set of stairs, to be arrested by Hooks.

Mahoney and Hightower are both reinstated, and for rescuing Harris and capturing his kidnapper, they receive the academy's highest commendation and medals. The film ends with all cadets graduating.

Cast 

 Steve Guttenberg as Cadet Carey Mahoney
 Kim Cattrall as Cadet Karen Thompson
 Bubba Smith as Cadet Moses Hightower
 Donovan Scott as Cadet Leslie Barbara
 Michael Winslow as Cadet Larvell Jones
 Andrew Rubin as Cadet George Martin
 David Graf as Cadet Eugene Tackleberry
 Bruce Mahler as Cadet Douglas Fackler
 Marion Ramsey as Cadet Laverne Hooks
 Brant von Hoffman as Cadet Kyle Blankes
 Scott Thomson as Cadet Chad Copeland
 G. W. Bailey as Lieutenant Thaddeus Harris
 George Gaynes as Commandant Eric Lassard
 Leslie Easterbrook as Sergeant Debbie Callahan
 George R. Robertson as Chief Henry J. Hurst
 Debralee Scott as Violet Fackler
 Ted Ross as Captain Reed
 Doug Lennox as Main Bad Guy
 Georgina Spelvin as Hooker
 Don Lake as Mr. Wig
 Michael J. Reynolds as Office Executive
 Gary Farmer as Sidewalk Store Owner
 John Hawkes as Tesky Truck Driver
 Kay Hawtrey as Surprise Party Lady
 Dar Robinson as Plaid Thug
 T. J. Scott as Tough
 Hugh Wilson as Angry Driver

Casting

The producers considered Michael Keaton, Tom Hanks and Judge Reinhold for the role of Carey Mahoney. Bruce Willis auditioned for the role of Carey Mahoney.

Production

Development 
Paul Maslansky says he got the idea for the film when in San Francisco filming The Right Stuff:
I noticed a bunch of ludicrous-looking police cadets being dressed down by a frustrated sergeant. They were an unbelievable bunch-including a lady who must have weighed over 200 pounds and a flabby man of well over 50. I asked the sergeant about them, and he explained that the mayor had ordered the department to accept a broad spectrum for the academy. "We have to take them in,"...[he said] ..."And the only thing we can do is wash them out." 
Maslansky said he wondered "But what if they actually made it?" He took the idea to Alan Ladd Jr who agreed to finance.
Neal Israel was hired to write the script with Pat Proft. Israel said:
It's a matter of block comedy scenes. Perhaps the most recognizable was the obvious results of guys eating beans in `Blazing Saddles.' If you have four or five of these block comedy scenes in a teen-age comedy, you have a hit. If your block comedy scenes are very, very strong ones, you have a blockbuster.
Dom DeLuise was considered to direct the film but he was unavailable. Hugh Wilson was hired as director based on his success with WKRP in Cincinnati even though he was not familiar with many films of this genre. He then saw a lot of those sort of movies and says "it was fairly discouraging. This immediately convinced me to cut down on the sleaze. I asked for, and got, the power to refine the Israel-Proft script. Maintaining that `funny is money,' I wanted to go for real laughter rather than going for the elements such as gratuitous sex and anti-Establishment exploits. I wanted jokes which were rooted in reality."

Maslansky says Wilson "took a lot of the vulgarity out; some of the very things I considered necessary. I worried that it was becoming more homogenized, and I told Hugh, `Let's keep some of the flatulence in.'"

Wilson says "I found out that the shower scene, the party scene and the fellatio scene were obligatory; I had to put them in. So I was stuck with trying to make those scenes as artistic as possible."

According to the Los Angeles Times, about "20 of the major elements in the movie" remain from the Israel and Proft version. Israel says that when Wilson and Maslansky turned in their rewrite to the Ladd Company, "it was rejected and the project was almost shelved. Only when they put back in dozens of our gags did the project get the go ahead."

Some of the scenes Wilson was unhappy with included the fellatio scene and the scene where a police sergeant was hurled into the back of a horse. A compromise was reached where these acts were not actually shown.

"I realize that you can carry grossness, rudeness and crudeness just so far before the audience finds it terribly repetitive and not so funny," said Wilson. "After the enormous success of Police Academy, I no longer believe that you have to show the female breast or make cruel ethnic jokes-not to mention the rampant sexism. And you don't have to reproduce the sounds that an overfed body makes."

Filming 
Opening scenes were shot in Toronto, Ontario. The camera booth scene was shot on the Cherry Street Bridge in Toronto. The Academy itself was previously the site of the Lakeshore Psychiatric Hospital in Etobicoke, and has since become the Lakeshore campus of Humber College. The studio scenes were shot at Lakeshore Film Studios; the city scenes were filmed in various parts of Toronto. The riot scenes was filmed at Kensington Market in Toronto, The Silver Dollar Room on Spadina Avenue is the real name of the bar were was filmed for the Blue Oyster Bar scenes.

Music 
In 2013, La-La Land Records issued a limited edition album of Robert Folk's score.

 Main Title/Night Rounds (1:52)
 Rounds Resume/Tackleberry (1:10)
 Barbara (0:51)
 Join Up (1:10)
 The Academy (1:16)
 Recruits (1:54)
 Pussycat/Uniforms (1:56)
 Assignment (1:20)
 Formation/Move Out (3:26)
 Obstacles (2:15)
 Martin and Company (0:46)
 Ball Games (0:27)
 More Martin (0:28)
 Regrets (1:05)
 Guns/In Drag (4:01)
 Warpath (0:28)
 Improvement (1:15)
 Jam Up (0:42)
 Hightower Drive (1:37)
 Santa Claus Is Coming to Town - J. Fred Coots and Haven Gillespie (0:40)
 Need to Talk/Hightower Leaves (1:16)
 Riot Starts (1:25)
 Riot Gear (2:42)
 SOB (0:32)
 Match (1:44)
 Where's Harris? (2:40)
 Straighten Up (1:26)
 Police Academy March (1:06)
 El Bimbo - Claude Morgan, performed by Jean-Marc Dompierre and His Orchestra (1:49)

Release

Home media 
 Police Academy VHS (1984) The original theatrical version of the film released in 1984. In Europe it was released on VHS as Police Academy: What An Institution!
 Police Academy: 20th Anniversary Special Edition DVD (1984) DVD was released around the world in 2004. Special features include a "Making of" documentary, Audio Commentary by the cast and the original theatrical trailer.
 Police Academy: The Complete Collection DVD [1984-1994]: This DVD collection is a seven disc boxset which included all seven Police Academy films released between 1984 and 1994. Police Academy 1, 2, 3, 6 and 7 are in 1.85:1 widescreen, Police Academy 4 and 5 are in 1.33:1 fullscreen. All of the films have multi-language subtitles and their own retrospective featurettes.
 4 Film Favorites: Police Academy 1-4 Collection DVD set was released September 15, 2009. This set contains the first four films in the series on three discs: the first two films separately, and the third and fourth films on one double-sided disc. Police Academy 5-7 would be released in a DVD set entitled "4 Film Favorites: Cop Comedy Collection", packaged with Loaded Weapon 1.
 Police Academy: What an Institution! Blu-ray was released July 1, 2013 as a Region Free Blu-ray. This Blu-ray contains one disc and special features.

Reception

Box office
Police Academy opened in the number 1 spot in 1,587 U.S. theaters on March 23, 1984, to a first weekend total gross of $8.6 million. The film went on to gross $81.2 million, becoming the 6th highest grossing American film of 1984. It grossed $68.6 million overseas for a total worldwide gross of $149.8 million. The film made a profit of $35 million.

Critical response
Police Academy received mixed reviews from critics. On Rotten Tomatoes, it has an approval rating of 57% based on 30 reviews, with the critical consensus reading: “Police Academy is rude, crude, and proudly sophomoric – which is either a condemnation or a ringing endorsement, depending on your taste in comedy.” On Metacritic the film has a score of 41 out of 100 based on reviews from 6 critics, indicating "mixed or average reviews".

Roger Ebert, of the Chicago Sun-Times, gave the movie zero stars out of four, commenting: “It's really something. It's so bad, maybe you should pool your money and draw straws and send one of the guys off to rent it so that in the future, whenever you think you're sitting through a bad comedy, he could shake his head, and chuckle tolerantly, and explain that you don't know what bad is”. Ebert's zero-stars review of the film became famous because, unlike many other movies he gave zero star ratings to (including I Spit On Your Grave and Freddy Got Fingered), he did not state that Police Academy was diseased or morally deficient, merely deeming it a failed comedy that not only had no laughs, but didn't seem to be trying to make people laugh. Gene Siskel also hated the film, and noted that it had a lot of what looked like setups for jokes and punchlines but would then not have either of them.

Critic Vincent Canby, of The New York Times, gave a mixed review, saying: “The movie plows through one outrageous sequence to the next with the momentum of a freight train”.
Rita Kemply, of The Washington Post, wrote: “Attention, all units: Slapstick in progress in the vicinity of Police Academy. Suspects wanted for mugging the camera and possession of night shtiks with intent to incite a laugh riot. Please respond to this blues burlesque, a uniformly funny hit sure to have a long run. Its target audience -- those who can take their T&A with a grain of assault. Its plot – a combo of Animal House and An Officer and a Gentleman. Its stars – a rainbow coalition of hot newcomers and dependable, unexpendable pros.”

Producer Paul Maslansky says that original feedback on the film was that it was not gross enough, with one executive reportedly saying: “What are you trying to do: make a damned Tootsie?”; and another claiming: “Paul, it doesn't fit the formula; it needs more flatulence, more slobbishness, more T&A.”.

References

External links 

 
 
 
 

 1
1984 films
1980s police comedy films
1980s English-language films
Warner Bros. films
Films about pranks
Films directed by Hugh Wilson
Films shot in Toronto
American slapstick comedy films
The Ladd Company films
Films with screenplays by Pat Proft
Films with screenplays by Neal Israel
Films scored by Robert Folk
Films with screenplays by Hugh Wilson
1984 directorial debut films
1984 comedy films
Films produced by Paul Maslansky
1980s American films